The following compounds are liquid at room temperature and are completely miscible with water; they are often used as solvents.  Many of these compounds are hygroscopic.

Organic Compounds

Inorganic compounds

See also
:Category:Alcohol solvents

External links
 Solvent miscibility table 
 Diethylenetriamine 
 Hydrazine 

Water-miscible solvents
Solvents